Shadows Over Chinatown is a 1946 film directed by Terry O. Morse. It is the second to last film featuring Sidney Toler as Charlie Chan.

Plot 
Chan investigates a murder for profit racket in San Francisco.  Toller was in poor health during the filming of this, and so much of the film is carried by the comedic interplay between #2 Son (Victor Sen Yung) and chauffeur, Birmingham Brown (Mantan Moreland).

Cast 
Sidney Toler as Charlie Chan
Victor Sen Yung as Jimmy Chan
Mantan Moreland as Birmingham Brown
Tanis Chandler as Mary Conover (alias Mary McCoy), former employee of an escort service
Mary Gordon as Mrs. Conover, grandmother of Mary Conover
Bruce Kellogg as Corp. Joe Thomas (alias Jack Tilford), sweetheart of Mary Conover
Paul Bryar as Mike Rogan, manager at the escort agency, former boss of Mary Conover
John Gallaudet as Craig Winfield, owner of escort agency, alias "Private Investigator" Jeff Hay
Alan Bridge as Capt. Allen
Jack Norton as Cosgrove, pickpocket

External links

 
Review of film at Variety

1946 films
American black-and-white films
Charlie Chan films
Monogram Pictures films
Films set in San Francisco
Chinatown, San Francisco in fiction
1946 mystery films
American mystery films
1940s American films